Improvisationstheater DRAMA light  is a theatre group in Baden-Württemberg, Germany.

Theatre companies in Germany